Tween Waters Inn Historic District is a national historic district located at Captiva, Florida in Lee County. It was established by F. Bowman and Grace B. Price in 1931 and expanded over the following 30 years.

It was added to the National Register of Historic Places in 2011.

References

National Register of Historic Places in Lee County, Florida
Historic districts on the National Register of Historic Places in Florida
Captiva Island